Harvest Rain Theatre Company is a theatre company based in Brisbane, Australia, known for presenting professional musical theatre.

Since its inception in 1985, Harvest Rain has produced theatre productions at a range of venues throughout Brisbane. From 1985 to 2008 the company operated out of the Sydney Street Theatre in New Farm. Now, Harvest Rain presents most of its major productions at the Queensland Performing Arts Centre at South Bank.

Harvest Rain's CEO and Artistic Director is Tim O'Connor.

Early history

Harvest Rain began in 1985 as a small drama group in New Farm, Queensland, Australia. The founding members of the company were the brothers Robbie Parkin and David Parkin and the husband and wife team Chris Crooks and Judy Crooks. The name "Harvest Rain" was chosen because Chris Crooks liked the word "harvest" and the team felt that the word "rain" softened it. The company initially staged a range of amateur productions and the shows featured a small ensemble of dedicated actors.

For 23 years the company operated out of the Sydney Street Theatre in New Farm. In 2008 the company moved to the Mina Parade Warehouse in Alderley and began presenting all its mainhouse productions at QPAC.

In 2012, the company announced that it was in the final stages of transitioning into becoming a fully professional musical theatre company, the first of its kind in Queensland.

In 2014, the company moved its training, rehearsals, and administration to a building on the north side of Brisbane known as the Hayward Street Studios. It continues to produce musicals, mostly at QPAC but also at other venues throughout Queensland.

Professional productions 
Harvest Rain produced Oklahoma! in 2013 as its first fully professional production.

In 2014, the company's first fully professional season included Guys and Dolls starring Ian Stenlake and Daryl Somers, Spamalot starring Jon English, Simon Gallaher, Frank Woodley and Julie Anthony, and an arena production of Cats starring Marina Prior and featuring over 500 performers on stage, making it the largest production of Cats ever staged in the southern hemisphere.

Spamalot won Harvest Rain the Matilda Award for Best Musical or Cabaret in 2014.

In 2015, the company produced The Pirates of Penzance to celebrate QPAC's 30th birthday. The show starred Andrew O'Keefe, John Wood and Nancye Hayes and featured Billy Bourchier as Frederic and Georgina Hopson as Mabel, in their professional debut. The production was directed by Simon Gallaher.

In 2016, Harvest Rain presented an arena production of Hairspray in Brisbane, Adelaide and Newcastle, with a cast featuring Lauren McKenna, Simon Burke, Christine Anu, Tim Campbell, Wayne Scott Kermond and Amanda Muggleton. An arena production of Grease followed, performed in Brisbane, Newcastle and Adelaide in 2017, Sydney, Melbourne, Canberra and Brisbane again, in 2018. In 2019, an arena production of The Wizard of Oz toured Brisbane, Adelaide and Newcastle in 2019 and Sydney in 2020.

Connection with sexual assault charges 
In November 2022, the company (now rebranded as AVT Live), was reported to have cancelled an Australian capital city tour of We Will Rock You: The Arena Experience after two men connected to the company were charged with a combined 75 sexual assault offences against eight men and boys aged 12 to 29 between 2001 and 2021.  As of 15 November 2022, the company's headquarters were reported as closed.

The Harvest Rain Theatre Company name as of 30th December 2022 is now linked with a ABN connected to Brisbane Junior Theatre Company

Notable people
Notable people associated with the company include:

Crew and staff

 Jack Bradford, theatrical director, 1996-1997, 1999-2001
 Simon Gallaher, company chair, 2012-2015
 Tim O'Connor, administrator, theatrical director, CEO

Cast

 Jack Bradford, 1995, 1999, 2001, 2004, 2007, roles in multiple productions
 Tim Campbell, 2017, Johnny Casino in Grease the Arena Experience
 Mark Conaghan, 1999, 2005, roles in multiple productions
 Julie Eckersley, 1999, in Much Ado About Nothing
 Jon English, 2014, King Arthur in Spamalot
 Michael Falzon, 2009, in Joseph and the Amazing Technicolour Dreamcoat
 Simon Gallaher, 2012 in Hairspray, 2014, in Spamalot
 David Knijnenburg, 1999-2001, 2005, 2007, roles in multiple productions
 Erika Naddei, 2011-2012, roles in multiple productions
 Tod Strike, 2000, Joseph in Joseph And The Amazing Technicolor Dreamcoat
 Daryl Somers, 2014, Nicely Nicely Johnson in Guys and Dolls.
 Steven Tandy, 2010, 2012, roles in multiple productions
John Wood, 2019, The Wizard in "The Wizard of Oz"

References

External links
 Harvest Rain Theatre Company 

Theatre in Brisbane
Theatre companies in Australia
Companies based in Brisbane
Musical theatre companies
Culture of Brisbane